Cornelis L. Visser  (born 14 November 1965, Stellendam) is a Dutch politician and since May 2017 mayor of Katwijk.

References

1964 births
Living people
People from Goedereede
Christian Democratic Appeal MEPs
MEPs for the Netherlands 2004–2009